Elizaveta Borisovna Alexandrova-Zorina (born 22 March 1984) is a Russian authoress and columnist.
She is also a publicist and blogger.
She is a columnist for Moskovskij Komsomolets.
Author of six books published by Eksmo.

Alexandrova was born in Leningrad and grew up in Kovdor.

She studied at the High Courses for Scriptwriters and Film Directors.

She is an atheist and radical leftist.

She is a Zvezda magazine award winner (2019).

References

Living people
1984 births
21st-century Russian novelists
Russian women novelists
21st-century Russian writers
21st-century Russian women writers
Russian bloggers
Russian women bloggers
Russian columnists
Russian women columnists